Audrys Juozas Bačkis (born 1 February 1937) is a Lithuanian prelate of the Catholic Church, a cardinal since 2001. He worked in the diplomatic service of the Holy See from 1964 to 1991, when he became Archbishop of Vilnius. He retired in 2013.

Early life
Bačkis was born in Kaunas to the family of Stasys Antanas Bačkis, a Lithuanian diplomat. In 1938 Bačkis' father was assigned to Paris where the family stayed after the Soviet occupation in June 1940. He completed his secondary education at the Institute Saint-Marie-de-Monceau, and studied philosophy at the Seminary of Saint-Sulpice in Issy-les-Moulineaux.

Bačkis studied at the Pontifical Gregorian University, Pontifical Ecclesiastical Academy, and Pontifical Lateran University, there Bačkis obtained his doctorate in canon law. Bačkis was ordained to the priesthood by Luigi Traglia on 18 March 1961, in Rome. He then did pastoral work among Lithuanian Americans in the United States, and finished his studies in Rome in 1964.

Service
In 1964 he entered the diplomatic service of the Holy See, serving as secretary of the nunciature to the Philippines (1964–1965), to Costa Rica (1965–1967), to Turkey (1967–1970), and to Nigeria (1970–1973). Bačkis was raised to the rank of Privy Chamberlain of His Holiness on 26 June 1965, and was called to the Council of Public Affairs of the Church in the Secretariat of State in 1973. He was the Vatican's delegate to the United Nations Conference in Vienna in 1975, and became Vice-Secretary of the Council for the Public Affairs of the Church in 1979.

On 5 August 1988, Bačkis was appointed Pro-Nuncio to the Netherlands and Titular Archbishop of Meta by Pope John Paul II. He received his episcopal consecration on the following 4 October from Pope John Paul himself, with Cardinal Achille Silvestrini and Bishop Juozas Preikšas serving as co-consecrators, in St. Peter's Basilica.

He was named Archbishop of Vilnius on 24 December 1991.

John Paul II created him Cardinal Priest of Natività di Nostro Signore Gesù Cristo a Via Gallia in the consistory of 21 February 2001.  Bačkis was one of the cardinal electors who participated in the 2005 papal conclave that selected Pope Benedict XVI as well as in the one in 2013 which selected Pope Francis. Since having reached the age of 80, Bačkis is no longer eligible to vote in any future conclaves.

Within the Lithuanian Episcopal Conference, he has been president (1993–1999, 2002–2005) and vice-president (1999–2002, 2005–2011). Besides his native Lithuanian, the Cardinal speaks English, French, German, Italian, Polish, and has a limited comprehension of Dutch. He is also known as one of the Catholic hierarchy's better Latin speakers.

Retirement
Pope Francis accepted Bačkis's resignation on 5 April 2013.

Pope Francis named Bačkis as his Special Envoy to celebrations marking the 1,025th anniversary of the Baptism (Conversion) of the Kievan Rus, to be held in Kyiv, Ukraine, on 17 and 18 August 2013.

Honours 
  : Grand Cross of the Order of Vytautas the Great (3 February 2003)

References

External links

 
 "Cardinal Audrys Juozas Bačkis", Catholic Church in Lithuania

20th-century Roman Catholic archbishops in Lithuania
1937 births
Living people
Clergy from Kaunas
Lithuanian cardinals
Roman Catholic archbishops of Vilnius
Pontifical Gregorian University alumni
Pontifical Ecclesiastical Academy alumni
Pontifical Lateran University alumni
Cardinals created by Pope John Paul II
Members of the Pontifical Council for Social Communications
Apostolic Nuncios to the Netherlands
Grand Crosses of the Order of Vytautas the Great
21st-century Roman Catholic archbishops in Lithuania
Lithuanian expatriates in France
Lithuanian expatriates in Italy
Lithuanian expatriates in the Philippines
Lithuanian expatriates in Coast Rica
Lithuanian expatriates in Nigeria